Alexander Masters is an English author, screenwriter, and worker with the homeless.  He lives in Cambridge, United Kingdom.

Masters is the son of authors Dexter Masters and Joan Brady. He was educated at Bedales School, and took a first in physics from King's College London. He then went to St Edmund's College, Cambridge for a further degree in maths, and then the beginnings of a PhD in the philosophy of quantum mechanics. He was studying for an MSc degree in mathematics with the Open University, and working as an assistant at a hostel for the homeless in Cambridge, when he wrote his first book.

He is the writer and illustrator of Stuart: A Life Backwards, the biography of Stuart Shorter. It explores how a young boy, somewhat disabled from birth, became mentally unstable, criminal and violent, living homeless on the streets of Cambridge. As the title suggests, the book starts from Shorter's adult life, tracing it back in time through his troubled childhood, examining the effects his family, schooling and disability had on his eventual state.  Masters wrote the book with Shorter's active and enthusiastic help.

Alexander Masters won an Arts Council Writers' Award for Stuart and went on to win the Guardian First Book Award and the Hawthornden Prize. The book was also shortlisted (in the biography category) for the Whitbread Book-of-the-Year Award, the Samuel Johnson Prize, and the National Book Critics Circle Award in the United States. He also wrote a screenplay adaptation, filmed in 2006 for the BBC and HBO, and broadcast in September 2007. It won the Royal Television Society Award in the Single Drama category and the Reims International Television award for the Best TV Screenplay.

In 2007, he collaborated with photographer Adrian Clarke on the book Gary's Friends, chronicling the lives of drug and alcohol abusers in North East England.

Masters is also the author of The Genius in My Basement, a biography of mathematician Simon P. Norton. In 2016, Masters published A Life Discarded: 148 Diaries Found in the Trash

Alexander Masters has been portrayed by Benedict Cumberbatch in Stuart: A Life Backwards, the 2007 BBC dramatization of his biography of Stuart Shorter.

Publications

References

External links
 
 
 Alexander Masters' staff CV, Kingston University department of humanities website
 "'Knife Man Dan' lives on in print", Peter Taylor-Whiffen, review of Stuart: A Life Backwards in ''The Independent, 7 June 2005

Year of birth missing (living people)
Living people
People educated at Bedales School
Alumni of St Edmund's College, Cambridge
Alumni of King's College London
English biographers
English screenwriters
English male screenwriters
English people of American descent
21st-century biographers
English male non-fiction writers
21st-century British screenwriters
21st-century English male writers
Male biographers